Spacer is an album by American jazz vibraphonist Jason Adasiewicz, which was recorded in 2011 and released on Delmark.  It was the second album by his trio Sun Rooms, featuring bassist Nate McBride and drummer Mike Reed.

Reception

The Down Beat review by Bill Meyer says about Adasiewicz's role in the trio "His playing with Sun Rooms proposes a broader role; the vibes generate melody and harmony the way a piano might in another trio, but they’re also like a drum kit, the source of the ensemble’s energy."

In a review for JazzTimes Mike Shanley notes "A casual listen to Spacer could give the impression that all the tracks have a similar approach and that one blends into the next. But this music shouldn’t be listened to casually."

The Tiny Mix Tapes review by Clifford Allen says "While there may be a number of opportunities to hear Adasiewicz in top form, Sun Rooms is a particularly fascinating trio that gives the vibraphonist ample room to stretch. It’s no wonder that he and his mates on Spacer are among Chicago’s first-call jazzmen."

Track listing
All compositions by Jason Adasiewicz except as indicated
 "Solo One" – 1:36
 "Hi Touch" – 5:59
 "Run Fly" – 4:51
 "Pillow" – 3:48
 "The Volunteer" (Nate McBride) – 4:44
 "Bees" – 5:30
 "Bobbie" (Eric Boeren) – 4:21
 "Diesel" – 4:49
 "Waiting in the Attic" – 3:52
 "Solo Two" – 2:36

Personnel
Jason Adasiewicz - vibraphone
Nate McBride  – bass
Mike Reed – drums

References

2011 albums
Jason Adasiewicz albums
Delmark Records albums